The molecular formula C16H21NO2 (molar mass: 259.34 g/mol, exact mass: 259.1572 u) may refer to:

 Nortilidine
 Propranolol
 Ramelteon
 Troparil

Molecular formulas